The PEOPLEnet Cup was a professional tennis tournament played on indoor hard courts. It was part of the Association of Tennis Professionals (ATP) Challenger Tour. It was held annually in Dnipropetrovsk, Ukraine, from 2003 till 2008.

Past finals

Singles

Doubles

See also
 Dnipro Arena

External links
Official website
ITF Search

ATP Challenger Tour
Tretorn SERIE+ tournaments
Hard court tennis tournaments
Indoor tennis tournaments
Tennis tournaments in Ukraine
Recurring sporting events established in 2003
2003 establishments in Ukraine
Recurring sporting events disestablished in 2008
Sport in Dnipro
2008 disestablishments in Ukraine